Fivos Vrahimis (born 18 May 1953) is a Cypriot former footballer who played as a midfielder and made 18 appearances for the Cyprus national team.

Club career
Vrahimis spent his entire career at Anorthosis Famagusta, which began in 1972 and lasted until 1986, when he had to retire due to injury. His greatest success with the club was the Cypriot Cup victory in 1975.

International career
Vrahimis made his debut for Cyprus on 30 January 1977 in a friendly match against Bulgaria, which finished as a 1–2 loss. He went on to make 18 appearances, scoring 4 goals, before making his last appearance on 13 November 1982 in a UEFA Euro 1984 qualifying match against Sweden, which finished as a 0–1 loss.

Career statistics

International

International goals

Honours
Anorthosis Famagusta
 Cypriot Cup: 1974–75

References

External links
 
 
 

1953 births
Living people
People from Famagusta District
Cypriot footballers
Cyprus under-21 international footballers
Cyprus international footballers
Association football midfielders
Anorthosis Famagusta F.C. players
Cypriot First Division players